The Macro-Siouan languages are a proposed language family that would include the Siouan, Iroquoian, and Caddoan families. Most linguists remain unconvinced that these languages share a genetic relationship, and the existence of a Macro-Siouan language family remains a subject of debate.

In the 19th century, Robert Latham suggested that the Siouan languages are related to the Caddoan and Iroquoian languages. In 1931, Louis Allen presented the first list of systematic correspondences between a set of 25 lexical items in Siouan and Iroquoian. In the 1960s and 1970s, Wallace Chafe further explored the link between Siouan and Caddoan languages. In the 1990s, Marianne Mithun compared the morphology and syntax of all the three families.  At present, the Macro-Siouan hypothesis based on relations among Siouan, Caddoan, and Iroquoian is not universally accepted as proven.

Notes

Bibliography
Campbell, Lyle (1997). American Indian Languages: The Historical Linguistics of Native America. Oxford: Oxford University Press.

 
Proposed language families